This is a list of communities in Yukon.

Municipalities

Unincorporated communities 

These areas lie within the Unorganized Yukon, which covers 99.8% of the territory's land mass.

Hamlets 
Statistics Canada recognizes two census subdivisions in Yukon that are classified as hamlets.
Ibex Valley
Mount Lorne

Localities 
The Gazetteer of Yukon recognized 96 localities as of February 2012. Two of these localities, Tagish and Upper Liard, are designated as census subdivisions by Statistics Canada, though are classified as settlements.

Aishihik
Ballarat Creek
Barlow
Bear Creek
Black Hills
Boundary
Braeburn
Brewer Creek
Britannia Creek
Brooks Brook
Calumet
Canyon
Canyon City
Carcross Cutoff
Caribou
Champagne
Clear Creek
Clinton Creek
Coffee Creek
Conrad
Dalton Post
De Wette
Dezadeash
Donjek
Dominion
Dry Creek
Dundalk
Eagle Plains
Flat Creek
Fort Reliance
Fort Selkirk
Forty Mile
Frances Lake
Glacier Creek
Glenboyle
Gold Bottom
Gold Run
Gordon Landing
Grand Forks
Granville, Yukon
Gravel Lake
Herschel
Hootalinqua
Hundred Mile Landing
Hutshi
Isaac Creek
Jakes Corner
Jensen Creek
Kirkman Creek
Kloo Lake
Klondike
Klukshu
Koidern
Kynocks
Lansdowne
Lansing
Lapierre House
Little Gold
Little River
Little Salmon
Little Teslin Lake
Livingstone, Yukon
Livingstone Creek
Lorne, Yukon
Mason Landing
McCabe Creek
McClintok
McQuesten
Mendenhall Landing
Minto, Yukon
Minto Bridge
Montague, Yukon
Moosehide
Morley River
Nesketahin
Ogilvie

Paris
Pelly Lakes
Quill Creek
Rampart House
Rancheria
Readford
Robinson
Rock Creek
Scroggie Creek
Selwyn
Silver City
Sixtymile
Snag
Snag Junction
Stevens Roadhouse
Stewart River
Stony Creek Camp
Sulphur
Summit Roadhouse
Tagish (also designated a census subdivision)
Takhini
Takhini Hot Springs
Ten Mile
Teslin Crossing
Teslin Lake
Teslin River
Thistle Creek
Tuchitua
Upper Laberge
Upper Liard (also designated a census subdivision)
Watson
Wernecke
West Dawson
Whitefish Station
Whitestone Village
Yukon Crossing

Dalton Post 
Dalton Post or Shäwshe is a former trading post and First Nations community on the Tatshenshini River. It was on the Dalton Trail near the Haines Highway. Today, it is a prime Pacific salmon fishing spot and serves as a base for whitewater rafting expeditions on the Tatshenshini and Alsek Rivers in the Tatshenshini-Alsek Provincial Park.

Jakes Corner 
Jakes Corner is a spot on the road, at historical mile 866 of the Alaska Highway, at the junction with connections to the Tagish Road and the Atlin Road. There are a small number of area residents, the junction being best known for a gas station and café. The gas station has numerous examples of old machinery.

Klukshu 
Klukshu's more recent history is as a seasonal aboriginal fishing community, benefitting from a large Chinook salmon run. Located near the Haines Highway, it has no permanent population. Interpretive information is provided by the Champagne and Aishihik First Nations.

Little Salmon 
Little Salmon is located on the Robert Campbell Highway between Faro and Carmacks, and stretches along the lake of the same name and the Yukon River. The only non-residential establishment is the Yukon government highway maintenance camp at Drury Creek. It was formerly an important settlement of the Little Salmon/Carmacks First Nation.

Silver City 
Silver City, a historic mining town, is today only the residence of a small number of people, one household being a bed and breakfast establishment. It is located at historical mile 1053 of the Alaska Highway.  It contains an airport, Silver City Airport.

Sulphur 
Sulphur or Sulphur Creek was a mining camp south-east of Dawson on a creek of the same name that flows into the Indian River. A post office was opened there on 28 October 1903 by G. W. Coffin. It was closed in July 1922. The place is mentioned in Jack London's story, To Build a Fire.

Settlements 
The Gazetteer of Yukon recognized 29 settlements as of February 2012. Eleven of these settlements are designated as census subdivisions by Statistics Canada.

Arlington
Armstrong
Bear Creek
Beaver Creek – also designated a census subdivision
Big Salmon
Burwash Landing – also designated a census subdivision
Carcross – also designated a census subdivision
Destruction Bay – also designated a census subdivision
Dry Creek
Dundalk
Herschel
Hundred Mile Landing
Johnsons Crossing – also designated a census subdivision
Keno Hill – also designated a census subdivision
Lewis
Livingstone
Lower Laberge
Marsh Lake
Mendenhall Landing
Old Crow – also designated a census subdivision
Pelly Crossing – also designated a census subdivision
Rampart House
Ross River – also designated a census subdivision
Selwyn
Snag
Stewart Crossing – also designated a census subdivision
Stewart River
Swift River – also designated a census subdivision
Teslin Lake

Herschel 
Herschel was a settlement on Herschel Island, serving as a whaling station, North-West Mounted Police post and Hudson's Bay Company store. It has been long abandoned, and shoreline erosion is threatening to wipe out the remaining buildings.

Stewart River 
Stewart River is a former settlement at the juncture of the Yukon and Stewart rivers. A few buildings and cabins remain, as well as private museum, which are threatened by erosion. It was founded as a trading post in the 1880s before the Klondike Gold Rush to serve placer miners working along the Stewart River. The Burian family was still living there in the late 1980s.

First Nations communities 

Statistics Canada recognizes five census subdivisions in Yukon that are classified as Indian settlements, and four census subdivisions as self-governments.

Indian settlements 
Champagne – also recognized as a locality
Kloo Lake
Klukshu – also recognized as a locality
Two Mile Village
Two and One-Half Mile Village

Self-governments 
Carcross 4
Lake Laberge 1
Moosehide Creek 2
Teslin Post 13

Ghost towns 
Elsa
Clinton Creek
Fort Frances
Forty Mile
Miner's Prayer

Miner's Prayer 
Miner's Prayer was settled near the Blackstone River Mining Concern, providing a retreat where the miners could indulge in billiards, alcohol and other entertainment otherwise forbidden on the mining settlement. Today it is home to fewer than thirty permanent residents.  It can be accessed by gravel road veering west from mile 57 on the Dempster Highway.

See also 
List of cities in Canada
List of towns in Canada

Notes

References 

Robert G. Woodall, The Postal History of Yukon Territory Canada, Lawrence, MA, Quarterman, Revised edition, 1976,

External links 
Yukon-Municipal Information
Association of Yukon Communities
Yukon Municipal Government Websites
Yukon community profiles web site

Communities